Idaea scintillularia, the diminutive wave, is a species of geometrid moth in the family Geometridae. It is found in North America.

The MONA or Hodges number for Idaea scintillularia is 7105.

References

Further reading

External links

 

Sterrhini
Articles created by Qbugbot
Moths described in 1888